The narrowed angle-wing katydid (Microcentrum angustatum) is from South America and the Caribbean

Locations

Samples have been collected from Brazil, Colombia, Bolivia and Trinidad.

References

Tettigoniidae
Taxa named by Carl Brunner von Wattenwyl
Insects described in 1878